The Delicate Forever (2014) is an album by  American ambient musician Steve Roach. It contains minimal electronics interplay musical space, breath, silence, and rich textural colors in a subtle dynamic flow. Recorded at Timeroom, manufactured by Disc Makers. Created using primarily analog equipment at The Timeroom, Southern Arizona, during 2013 and 2014.

Reception 
The album debuted at number six on the Billboard New Age chart.

Hypnagogue reviewed this album positively, said that "The Delicate Forever is one of those Steve Roach works that’s designed to augment the space around you or open the space within you, depending on how you choose to listen. Each of the five pieces is marked by its own texture."

Track listing

Personnel 
 Steve Roach – performer
 Sam Rosenthal – design, layout
 Steve Matson – cover

References

External links 
 The Delicate Forever at Discogs

2014 albums
Steve Roach (musician) albums